The Agit (stylized as THE AGIT) is a concert series brand by SM Entertainment. It is held in SMTOWN Theatre located in Samseong-dong, Coex Artium in Seoul, South Korea.

The Story by Jonghyun 

The Story by Jonghyun is the first concert series by Jonghyun, which was held from October 2 to October 4, 2015, and later from October 8 to October 11, 2015. The encore was held on December 12 and December 13, 2015.

Set list 

 "Déjà-Boo"
 "Hallelujah"
 "Juliette" (Shinee cover) (Acoustic version)
 "Playboy" (Exo cover)
 "No More" (Lim Kim cover)
 "Red Candle" (Son Dam-bi cover)
 "U & I"
 "Happy Birthday" / "Maybe Tomorrow" / "02:34" / "A Gloomy Clock" (IU cover) / "Love Belt"
 "Elevator"
 "I'm Sorry"
 "End of a Day"
 "Diphylleia Grayi"
 "Fine"
 "Like You"
 "Crazy (Guilty Pleasure)"
Encore
"Fortune Cookie"
 "Beautiful Tonight"{{hidden|headercss=background: #88d8c0; font-size: 100%; width: 75%;|contentcss=text-align: left; font-size: 100%; width: 75%;|header=Set list for The Story by Jonghyun [Epilogue]|content=
 "Déjà-Boo"
 "Hallelujah"
 "Mono-Drama"
 "Neon"
 "Playboy" (Exo cover)
 "No More" (Lim Kim cover)
 "Red Candle" (Son Dam-bi cover)
 "U & I"
 "Maybe Tomorrow" / "A Gloomy Clock" (IU cover) /  "02:34" / "Happy Birthday" / "Love Belt"
 "Elevator"
 "I'm Sorry"
 "End of a Day"
 "DiphylleiaGrayi"
 "Fine"
 "Like You"
 "Crazy (Guilty Pleasure)"
Encore
"Fortune Cookie"
 "Beautiful Tonight"
 "Our Season"
}}

Shows

Taeyeon's Very Special Day 
Taeyeon's Very Special Day is the first concert series by Taeyeon, which was held from October 23 to October 25, 2015, and later from October 30 to November 1, 2015.

Set list 

 "I"
 "Farewell"
 "Set Me Free"
 "Only One"
 "Missing You Like Crazy"
 "Can You Hear Me"
 "Holler" (Girls' Generation-TTS cover)
 "Eyes" (Girls' Generation-TTS cover)
 "Twinkle" (Girls' Generation-TTS cover)
 "Stress"
 "End of a Day"
 "Love Me like You Do" (Ellie Goulding cover)
 "Merry-Go-Round" / "Lion Heart" (Girls' Generation cover)
 "Lion Heart" / "Top Secret (Shake the Tree)" (Girls' Generation cover)
 "Dancing Queen" / "Goodbye" (Girls' Generation cover)
Encore
"U R"
 "Gemini"

Shows

And It's Fall Again
And It's Fall Again is the first concert series by Kyuhyun, which was held from November 5 to November 8, 2015, and later from November 13 to November 15, 2015.

Set list 

 "Hope is a Dream That Doesn't Sleep"
 "Eternal Sunshine"
 "One Confession"
 "Remember Me"
 "Because I Miss You"
 "Late Autumn"
 "The Etude of Memory" (Kim Dong-ryul cover)
 "Too Much" (Kim Soohee cover)
 "Stranger"
 "The Day We Felt the Distance"
 "New Endless Love"
 "Kanade"
 "Fear" (Mino cover)
 "At Gwanghwamun"
Encore
"A Million Pieces"
 "Piano Forest"
 "Till I Reach Your Star"

Shows

Ever Lasting Star
Ever Lasting Star is the first concert series by Ryeowook, which was held from February 19 to February 21, 2016.

Set list 

 "Problem" (Ariana Grande cover)
 "Foxy Girl"
 "Coagulation" (Super Junior cover)
 "Dorothy" (Super Junior cover)
 "Love U More" (Super Junior cover)
 "This is Love" / "Sorry Sorry" / "It's You" / "Bonamana" / "Devil" (Super Junior medley)
 "Mikazuki" (Ayaka cover) / Common Jasmine Orange (Jay Chou cover) / It Could Be Love (Stamp cover) / "Die Hard" (Justin Lo cover) / "Bunga Terakhir" (Bebi Romeo cover) / "Baby" (Justin Bieber cover) (International medley)
 "Poom"
 "Like a Star"
 "People You May Know"
 "The Little Prince"
Encore
"Hello"
 "One Fine Spring Day"

Shows

Sweet Coffee
Sweet Coffee ("A Cup of Coffee and a Lot of Syrup") is the first concert series by Yesung, which was held from June 3 to June 19, 2016. The encore of the concert, titled Sweet Coffee -Refill-, was held from August 5 to August 7, 2016.

Set list 

 "My Dear"
 "We"
 "Promise You"
 "Storm" (Super Junior cover)
 "Gray Paper" / "It Has To Be You"
 "Loving You" / "Waiting for You" / "Blind for Love" (OST medley)
 "Your Eyes"
 "It's You" + "Haru" (Super Junior cover)
 "Between"
 "Spring in Me"
 "Happy Together" (Super Junior cover)
 "U" / "Simply Beautiful" (Super Junior medley 1)
 "This Is Love" / "No Other" (Super Junior medley 2)
 "Way for Love" / "Show Me Your Love" / "Pajama Party" (Super Junior medley 3)
 "Your Echo"
 "Here I Am"
Encore
"So Close Yet So Far"
 "Confession"

Shows

Weekend 
Weekend is the first concert series by Tiffany, which was held from June 10 to June 12, 2016, and later from June 24 to June 26, 2016.

Set list 

 "I Just Wanna Dance"
 "Talk"
 "Fool"
 "What Do I Do"
 "Weekend"
 "Bittersweet & Crazy"
 "Once in a Lifetime"
 "A Dream is a Wish Your Heart Makes" / "Part of Your World" (Disney medley)
 "Ring" / "Only One" / "I'm Alone" (OST medley)
 "Yellow Light"
 "Baby Steps" / "Talk Talk" / "Indestructible" (English version) (Girls' Generation cover)
 "Moon & Sunrise" (BoA cover) / "Same Old Love" (Selena Gomez cover) / "Red" (Taylor Swift cover) / "Dangerous Woman" (Ariana Grande cover) / "This Kiss" (Carly Rae Jepsen cover) / "Cake by the Ocean" (DNCE cover)
 "Heartbreak Hotel"
Encore
"Party" (Girls' Generation cover)

Shows

Coming Home 
Coming Home ("Ordinary Day") is the first concert series by Kangta, which was held from November 4 to November 6, 2016. Originally scheduled for a three-day show, two performances in Seoul and two in Busan were added.

Set list 

 "Love is Coming"
 "Memories"
 "Late Summer Night"
 "Sorry, Sorry" (Super Junior cover)
 "Looking Back and Loving Again"
 "Waiting..." (BoA cover)
 "Russian Roulette (Red Velvet cover)
 "Candy" / "Full of Happiness" / "Hope" (H.O.T. medley)
 "Falling in Love"
 "My Life"
 "Say Something" (A Great Big World cover)
 "Still With You"
 "Pine Tree" + "Polaris"
 "Diner"
Encore
"Propose"
Together, Forever{{hidden|headercss=background: #fcf2d8; font-size: 100%; width: 75%;|contentcss=text-align: left; font-size: 100%; width: 75%;|header=Set list for the additional shows|content=
 "Love is Coming"
 "Late Summer Night"
 "Sorry, Sorry" (Super Junior cover)
 "Still With You"
 "Looking Back and Loving Again"
 "Waiting..." (BoA cover)
 "Russian Roulette (Red Velvet cover)
 "Candy" / "Full of Happiness" / "Hope" (H.O.T. medley)
 "Falling in Love"
 "My Life"
 "Say Something" (A Great Big World cover)
 "Pine Tree" + "Polaris"
 "Diner"
Encore
"Propose"
Together, Forever
}}

Shows

Love, Still

Love, Still was the first concert series by Seohyun. It was held from February 24 to February 26, 2017, with encore shows added in April.

Shows

The Letter

The Letter was the second concert series by Jonghyun under The Agit branding. It was held from May 26 to July 2, 2017. 12 concerts were initially planned, but Jonghyun decided to hold eight more after they sold out at fans' request.

Shows

Key Land

Key Land was the first concert series by Key. It was held from February 2 to February 17, 2019. Six concerts were originally scheduled, with five additional performances added later to accommodate demand. All 11 shows sold out.

Shows

References 

SM Entertainment
SM Town
SM Town concert tours